Tajul Islam Md. Faruk (died 31 January 2019) was a Bangladesh Awami League politician and a Jatiya Sangsad member representing the Rajshahi-4 constituency during 1991-1995.

Career
Faruk was elected to parliament from Rajshahi-4 as a Bangladesh Awami League candidate in 1991. He was the general secretary of Rajshahi District unit of Bangladesh Awami League.

References

2019 deaths
Awami League politicians
5th Jatiya Sangsad members
Year of birth missing
Place of birth missing